Un-Scripted Theater Company® is an improvisational theater company in San Francisco, California. Un-Scripted Theater Company performs many kinds of improv formats, such as comedy, mystery, drama, adventure, and musicals, each presented in 4 to 6 week runs each season, each with its own Director, format, and vision. Un-Scripted specializes in narrative and genre-based "single-story" improvised theater.

History
Un-Scripted Theater Company was founded in 2002 when the Thursday night performance group, The Belfry, was cut from the line up at San Francisco's BATS Improv. Determined to continue their performance work, 8 of the original 20 improvisors of The Belfry left and started Un-Scripted Theater Company in January 2003.  Since then, Un-Scripted Theater Company has performed hundreds of shows all over the Bay Area, throughout California and across the United States.

Founding Members 
Alan Goy
Brian McBride
Christian Utzman
Cort Worthington
Glenn Etter
Jennifer Kah
Susan Snyder
Tara McDonough

Style
Un-Scripted Theater Company performs both Shortform and Longform improvisation. Shows are 2 hours long, with one intermission. Improvised theater is rooted in the idea that whatever you can perform with a script, like a play, movie, or musical can also be improvised, with unique and surprising results, which tap into deep universal themes and the innate creativity and individuality of all the players.

Organization
Un-Scripted Theater Company is a 501c3 non-profit performing arts company. It has a core performing Ensemble, some of whom make up the company's professional staff. Each show typically features two or more guests from outside the Ensemble. Guest Improvisors are chosen by the Director of the show at open auditions, which are held before the start of the show's rehearsal period. Each show has a larger cast size than the number of performers in any given night's show, so the composition of the cast changes each night.

Un-Scripted's rehearsal period and performance schedule that resembles traditional, scripted theater.

Show Titles, by Year

2012
Un-Abridged: The Best of Ten Years of Un-Scripted
Act 1: Scene 2

2011
A Tale of Two Genres: An Improvised Dickens Musical
Fear
Act 1: Scene 2
Secret Identity Crisis

2010
Un-Scripted: un-scripted
In A World
A Tale of Two Genres: An Improvised Dickens Musical

2009
Let it Snow!
Shakespeare: The Musical
Un-Scripted: un-scripted

2008
The Great Puppet Bollywood Extravaganza 
Un-Scripted: un-scripted
San Francisco Improv Festival
Theater: The Musical
Three

2007
The Great Puppet Musical
You Bet Your Improvisor
The Love Show
Shakespeare: Un-Scripted
Let it Snow!

2006
Supertrain
The Impossible Film Project
Theatresports RAW
Two Man Longform at the Bay Area Comedy Festival
You Bet Your Improvisor
The Short & the Long of It (Abridged) at the Chicago Improv Festival Nine
Love at First Sight

2005
Let it Snow!
The Impossible Film Project
The Short & the Long of It!
Love at First Sight
You Bet Your Improvisor

2004
Let It Snow!
Fear
The Short & the Long of It!
Improvised Bawdy Shakespeare
Aussie Rules Theatersports
"Three"
Bawdy Shakespeare at BATS Improv
Improv Survivor

2003
The Cafe Sappore series
FEAR. reborn
The Amazing Improvised Musical!
Improvised Bawdy Shakespeare
Impro Bingo
The Short & the Long Of It!
Spring Sing and Improv Carnival Gala

Current Ensemble
Christian Utzman
David Boyll
Derek Cochran
Ian Anstee
Jerry Ruoti
Melissa Holman-Kursky
Merrill Gruver
Michael Fleming
Molly Robertson
Paul Holman-Kursky
Peter Chapman
Rachel Van Heteren
Steven Aacker
Susie Sargent
Vanessa Konkers Speed

Press
"Spicy & Cheap: New, improv'd Shakespeare" by Lisa Drostova and Kelly Vance - East Bay Express, July 21, 2004
"Act Scared: Horror on the spot" by Anneli Rufus, Stefanie Kalem, and Annika Dukes - East Bay Express, October 27, 2004
"The 'Snow' must go on" by Tiffany Maleshefski - San Francisco Examiner, December 7, 2004 (review of Let It Snow!)
"Playing the Short and the Long of It, Un-Scripted" by Betsy M. Hunton - Berkeley Daily Planet, June 10, 2005 (review of The Short and the Long of It)
"Stage Fog: The Making It Up As We Go Along Edition" - SFist.com, February 25, 2005 (review of You Bet Your Improvisor)
"The Theater: Comedy Cohabitation Off Union Square" by Michael Katz - Berkeley Daily Planet, October 27, 2006 (review of Supertrain)
"The audience's input keeps 'Puppet' lively" by Pat Craig - Contra Costa Times, May 7, 2007 (review of The Great Puppet Musical)
"The humans are okay, but the puppets are the real stars" By Molly Rhodes - SF Weekly, May 23, 2007 (review of The Great Puppet Musical)
"Improv making up for lost time" by Sam Hurwitt - San Francisco Chronicle, July 15, 2007
"Top Picks" (Shakespeare: Un-Scripted) - SFWeekly.com, August 29, 2007
"Your Show Will Be Different" By Paul Sinasohn - San Francisco Bay Times, August 30, 2007 (Review of Shakespeare: Un-Scripted)
"What the hell did I get myself into?" (audio review of Let it Snow) - The Cool as Hell Theater Show, November 28, 2007
"Best of the Bay: Nightlife and Entertainment" - SF Bay Guardian, 2008
"'Let It Snow!' is musical that's made to order" By Sam Hurwitt - Marin Independent Journal, December 2, 2009

External links 
 Un-Scripted Theater Company Website
 How the improvisation at the Un-Scripted Theater Company is different and how to get cast in an Un-Scripted Theater Company show

Improvisational troupes